Emmenagogues (also spelled emmenagogs) are herbs which stimulate blood flow in the pelvic area and uterus; some stimulate menstruation. Women use emmenagogues to stimulate menstrual flow when menstruation is absent for reasons other than pregnancy, such as hormonal disorders or conditions like oligomenorrhea (light menses).

According to Riddle, these herbs were also used to assist women whose menstruation was "delayed", for the reason that they had conceived. There are a large number of substances which can act as emmenagogues. Many, such as Mentha pulegium, European pennyroyal, or Tansy, may, as a tea, bring on menses, but if taken later in pregnancy, in strong or concentrated doses, such as pennyroyal or tansy oil, pose serious medical hazards including organ damage or incomplete abortions. Rue (Ruta graveolens) and Peganum harmala are other commonly available emmenagogues which can result in serious harm.

References

Further reading
Herbal Safety: Herbs to Avoid During Pregnancy

Herbs
Menstrual cycle
Obstetrical and gynaecological procedures